In geology, eduction is a process in which the Earth's crust spreads sideways, exposing deep-seated rocks.

It is prominent in the middle layers of the Himalayas, where gravity pushes the mountains down. Together with a high grade of erosion, this activity brings deep rocks to the surface, many from more than a depth of 100 km. The unusually fast elevation preserves rare metastable minerals, e.g. diamonds and coesite.

See also
Desert pavement, describing other forms of surface rock formation.

References

Geological processes
Rock formations